Koyyuru is a village and a Mandal in Alluri Sitharama Raju district in the state of Andhra Pradesh in India.

Geography
It has an average elevation of 275 meters (905 feet).

References 

Villages in Alluri Sitharama Raju district